Annulatascus is a genus of fungi in the Annulatascaceae family of the Ascomycota. The relationship of this taxon to other taxa within the Sordariomycetes class is unknown (incertae sedis), and it has not yet been placed with certainty into any order. The genus is characterized by taxa that are saprobic on submerged, decaying plant material in freshwater habitats. Morphologically the taxa possess dark brown to black perithecia, long tapering hyaline septate paraphyses, eight-spored asci with relatively massive J- apical rings, and ascospores that may or may not possess gelatinous sheaths or appendages. There are currently 17 species included in the genus.

Taxonomy
Annulatascus is a genus established by mycologist Kevin D. Hyde in 1992, who created it to accommodate Annulatascus velatisporus, the type species of the genus.

Species
Mycobank currently lists 19 names, one of which has been transferred to another genus, and another that is a spelling variant, as species of Annulatascus. Thus there are 17 recognized species.
Annulatascus apiculatus F.R.Barbosa & Gusmão 2009
Annulatascus aquaticus W.H.Ho, K.D.Hyde & Hodgkiss 1999
Annulatascus aquatorba Boonyuen & Sri-indrasutdhi 2012
Annulatascus biatriisporus K.D.Hyde 1995
Annulatascus citriosporus J.Fröhl. & K.D.Hyde 2000
Annulatascus fusiformis K.D.Hyde & S.W.Wong 2000
Annulatascus hongkongensis W.H.Ho, Ranghoo, K.D.Hyde & Hodgkiss 1999
Annulatascus joannae K.M.Tsui, Hodgkiss & K.D.Hyde 2002
Annulatascus lacteus K.M.Tsui, Hodgkiss & K.D.Hyde 2002
Annulatascus licaulae J.Fröhl. & K.D.Hyde 2000
Annulatascus liputii L.Cai & K.D.Hyde 2002
Annulatascus menglensis D.M.Hu, L.Cai & K.D.Hyde 2012
Annulatascus nilensis Abdel-Wahab & Abdel-Aziz 2011
Annulatascus palmietensis Goh, K.D.Hyde & Steinke 1998
Annulatascus triseptatus S.W. Wong, K.D.Hyde & E.B.G.Jones 1999
Annulatascus tropicalis Ranghoo & K.D.Hyde 2002
Annulatascus velatisporus K.D.Hyde 1992

References

Sordariomycetes genera
Annulatascaceae